Selimiye Mosque (Selim II Mosque) is a 16th-century Ottoman mosque in Konya, Turkey.

Location

The mosque is in the Karatay secondary municipality of Konya. It is situated in the business center of the city to the east of the Aziziye Mosque. The mosque was built next to the funerary shrine complex of Mevlana Celalüddin Rumi, a Persian sufi mystic (today the Mevlâna Museum).

History
The mosque had been commissioned in 1558 by Selim II while he was still a şehzade (prince) working as a sanjak governor. Although the mosque was constructed while Mimar Sinan held the post of chief architect, the building is not listed in any of his autobiographies. In Konya Sinan only lists the renovation of a hospice. The construction was completed in 1570 after Selim became the sultan. Later it was repaired three times; in 1685, 1816 and 1914.

Architecture
The double-minaret mosque is a typical 16th century Ottoman mosque and it resembles Fatih Mosque in İstanbul. The praying area is roofed by a big dome. There are seven small domes over the portico. The mihrab is made of blue marble and the minbar is made of white marble.

References

Sources

External links
Selimiye Mosque, Konya, Archnet

Mosques in Konya
Ottoman mosques in Konya
16th-century mosques
Religious buildings and structures completed in 1570
Mosque buildings with domes